Kasie Sue Hunt (born May 24, 1985) is an American political correspondent for CNN. From 2013 to 2021, she was NBC News' Capitol Hill correspondent, covering Congress across all NBC News and MSNBC platforms, and was the host of MSNBC's Way Too Early with Kasie Hunt and Kasie DC.

Early life and education
Hunt was born in Dearborn, Michigan and grew up in Wayne, Pennsylvania. She is the daughter of Bruce and Krista Hunt and the sibling of younger sister Carly Hunt. Her father manages real estate design and construction for Penn Medicine, University of Pennsylvania Health System in Philadelphia, and her mother is a yoga teacher in Easton. Her sister is a former golfer for both the Georgetown Hoyas and Maryland Terrapins women's golf teams.

Hunt graduated from Conestoga High School in 2003. She attended George Washington University graduating magna cum laude with a degree in international affairs in 2006.  She earned her master's degree in sociology from St John's College, Cambridge.

Career

Hunt started her career in journalism as an intern in the political unit of NBC News. She was a health policy reporter for the National Journal'''s CongressDaily, writing about the passage of the Affordable Care Act. She wrote for Politico, covering the 2010 midterm elections. She started working as a national political reporter for the Associated Press in August 2011 and covered Mitt Romney's 2012 presidential campaign.

In January 2013, Hunt joined NBC News as an off-air reporter and producer covering Congress and politics. She started appearing regularly on MSNBC as a political reporter and in November 2014 became a political correspondent. She wrote for msnbc.com and appeared regularly on MSNBC and Bloomberg shows, including Morning Joe, Hardball with Chris Matthews, and With All Due Respect.

In October 2017, Hunt began anchoring her own talk show on MSNBC, Kasie DC, which aired in two separate segments on Sundays at 7 p.m. and 8 p.m. ET The final episode of Kasie DC aired on Sunday, September 13, 2020.

On September 21, 2020, Kasie Hunt began anchoring a restart of the MSNBC talk show Way Too Early under the new name Way Too Early with Kasie Hunt. That program aired on weekday mornings from 5 a.m. to 6 a.m. ET.
On July 16, 2021, Hunt announced it was her last day with the network.

On August 10, 2021, CNN announced via Twitter that Hunt would be their first hire of CNN+, a new streaming service the network would be launching. In that role, Hunt would serve as an anchor of a new show, The Source with Kasie Hunt''. Additionally, it was announced that Hunt would serve as Chief National Affairs Analyst. Kasie Hunt's new program debuted on CNN+ on March 29, 2022. It ended on April 22, 2022, the day after it was announced that CNN+ would be shutting down, which it did on April 28.

Personal life
Kasie Hunt married NBC News producer Matt Rivera on May 6, 2017. In September 2019, she gave birth to her first child, a boy. In March 2023, she gave birth to her second child, a girl.

In October 2021, Hunt underwent a four-hour surgery for the successful removal of a benign brain tumor.

References

External links

1985 births
Living people
Alumni of St John's College, Cambridge
American political journalists
American television reporters and correspondents
American women television journalists
Elliott School of International Affairs alumni
MSNBC people
NBC News people
CNN people
Journalists from Michigan
People from Delaware County, Pennsylvania
Journalists from Pennsylvania
21st-century American journalists